Walter Taylor Sumner (December 5, 1873 – September 1935) was the fourth bishop of the Episcopal Diocese of Oregon from 1915 to 1935.

Early life 
Sumner was born in Manchester, New Hampshire on December 5, 1873, to parents Charles Sumner and Rintha Sumner. He received a bachelor's degree in science from Dartmouth College, a graduate degree from Western Theological Seminary, and a Doctor of Divinity from Northwestern University.

Career 
Sumner was ordained to the diaconate on November 7, 1903, and to the priesthood on May 20, 1904. Sumner was in charge of St. George Mission, Grand Crossing, Illinois. By 1906 he became Dean of the Cathedral of St Peter and Paul in Chicago. Sumner was elected Fourth Bishop of Oregon, on September 16, 1914, serving until his death in 1935.

Death
Sumner died on September 4, 1982, in the Good Samaritan Hospital in Portland, Oregon. He was buried in Manchester, New Hampsire.

References 
 

1873 births
1935 deaths
Episcopal Church in Oregon
Episcopal bishops of Oregon